Route 840, or Highway 840, may refer to:

Canada
 Alberta Highway 840

United States
 
 
 
 
 
 
 
 
 
 
 
  (former)